Nallamuthu Gounder Mahalingam College, is a general degree college located at Pollachi, Coimbatore District, Tamil Nadu. It was established in the year 1957. The college is affiliated with Bharathiar University. This college offers different courses in arts, commerce and science.

Departments

Science
Mathematics
Physics
Chemistry
Computer Science
Botany
Zoology

Arts and Commerce
Tamil
English
History
Economics
Commerce
B.com(CA)commerce with computer applications

Accreditation
The college is recognized by the University Grants Commission (UGC).

References

External links
https://www.ngmc.org
https://www.ngmcollege.in
https://www.ngmtamil.in

Educational institutions established in 1957
1957 establishments in Madras State
Colleges affiliated to Bharathiar University